Bernard Baruch Babani (May 12, 1913 – October 1975) was a UK book publisher, who started publishing technical books in 1942 from which Bernard Babani (Publishing) Ltd was formed, which is now run by his son, Michael Babani, from offices in London. His wife was Sarah Biletnikoff.

Bernard Publishing published many of Sir Clive Sinclair's books in late 1950s and into the early 1960s. He was an agent for the technical writer F.G. Rayer.

Babani died in October 1975.

References 

 Adamson, Ian; Kennedy, Richard (1986). Sinclair and the "Sunrise" Technology. London: Penguin Books. 224 pp. .
 Dale, Rodney (1985). The Sinclair Story. London: Duckworth. 184 pp. .

External links
 Babani Books
 

British book publishers (people)
Amateur radio people
1913 births
1975 deaths